Christiaan Gerardus Cornelissen (1864–1942) was a Dutch syndicalist writer, economist, and trade unionist.

Further reading
 Christianus Gerardus Cornelissen in Biografisch Woordenboek van het Socialisme en de Arbeidersbeweging in Nederland (BWSA)
Archief Christiaan Cornelissen. International Institute of Social History.

External links 

 Christiaan Cornelissen, text archive on Anarchisme.nl

1864 births
1942 deaths
People from 's-Hertogenbosch
Dutch anarchists
Dutch economists
Dutch expatriates in the United Kingdom
Syndicalists